Swainsboro is a city in Emanuel County, Georgia, United States. As of the 2020 census, the city had a population of 7,425. The city is the county seat of Emanuel County.

Geography

Swainsboro is located near the center of Emanuel County at 32°35'37" North, 82°19'56" West (32.593743, -82.332146). U.S. Route 80 passes through the center of the city, and U.S. Route 1 bypasses it to the west. US 80 leads east  to Statesboro and west  to Dublin, while US 1 leads north  to Augusta and south  to Waycross.

Demographics

2020 census

As of the 2020 United States census, there were 7,425 people, 2,697 households, and 1,783 families residing in the city.

2000 census
As of the census of 2000, there were 6,943 people, 2,685 households, and 1,836 families residing in the city. The racial makeup of the city was 48.06% White, 49.68% African American, 0.14% Native American, 0.35% Asian, 0.01% Pacific Islander, 1.22% from other races, and 0.53% from two or more races.  2.03% of the population were Hispanic or Latino of any race.

There were 2,685 households, out of which 33.2% had children under the age of 18 living with them, 39.0% were married couples living together, 25.7% had a female householder with no husband present, and 31.6% were non-families. 28.4% of all households were made up of individuals, and 13.1% had someone living alone who was 65 years of age or older.  The average household size was 2.54 and the average family size was 3.10.

In the city, the population was spread out, with 28.9% under the age of 18, 10.2% from 18 to 24, 23.4% from 25 to 44, 21.8% from 45 to 64, and 15.7% who were 65 years of age or older.  The median age was 35 years. For every 100 females, there were 81.0 males.  For every 100 females age 18 and over, there were 73.3 males.

The median income for a household in the city was $20,268, and the median income for a family was $26,789. Males had a median income of $26,193 versus $17,425 for females. The per capita income for the city was $14,617.  32.1% of the population and 28.8% of families were below the poverty line. 45.7% of those under the age of 18 and 28.9% of those 65 and older were living below the poverty line.

History
In 1822, the Georgia state legislature established "Swainsborough" as the seat of Emanuel County. The town was named in recognition of Stephen Swain, the state senator who introduced the bill for the county's creation in 1812. The town's name was changed to "Paris" at its incorporation on February 18, 1854, but three years later reverted to its current name, Swainsboro.

Transportation
Early in its corporate life, much like other rural Georgia towns, Swainsboro depended on railroads for transportation. However, in the 1930s, many of the town's streets and sidewalks were paved, and Swainsboro found itself at the intersection of two major national highways, U.S. 1 and U.S. 80, thus earning its city motto: "Crossroads of the Great South". U.S. 1 was the principal highway from Maine to Key West, and U.S. 80, at that time, ran from Tybee Island, Georgia, to San Diego.

Education

Emanuel County School District 
The Emanuel County School District, run by the Emanuel County Board of Education, holds pre-school to grade twelve, and consists of three elementary schools, a middle school, a high school, and two academies. The district has 293 full-time teachers and over 4,664 students.
 Adrian School of Performing Arts (Closed)
 David Emanuel Academy (DEA)
 Swainsboro Elementary School
 Swainsboro Primary School
 Twin City Elementary School
 Swainsboro Middle School
 Emanuel County Institute
 Swainsboro High School

Higher education 
 East Georgia State College - Swainsboro Campus
 Southeastern Technical College - Swainsboro Campus

Notable people
 Ray Guy, NFL Hall of Famer, retired punter, three-time Super Bowl champion
 Dwight Howard, NBA Player (born in Swainsboro, raised in Atlanta)
 Rufus Hannah, aka "Rufus the Stunt Bum", born and raised in Swainsboro, famous for his role in the controversial Bumfights series
 Doug Johnson, record producer, songwriter, record label executive, born in Swainsboro
 Pat Mitchell, media personality and businesswoman 
 Tony Mitchell, professional basketball player for the Fort Wayne Mad Ants, former Milwaukee Bucks player
 George L. Smith II, member of the Georgia House of Representatives (1944–1973) and Speaker of the same body (1959–1962, 1967–1973)
 Ben Troupe, born in Swainsboro, played high school football in Augusta, former University of Florida football standout
 Larry Jon Wilson, singer-songwriter, born in Swainsboro

References

External links
 Swainsboro official website

Cities in Georgia (U.S. state)
Cities in Emanuel County, Georgia
County seats in Georgia (U.S. state)